Starosel is a village in central Bulgaria, Hisarya Municipality, Plovdiv Province. It lies at the foot of the Sredna Gora mountain range along the shores of Pyasachnik River.

Starosel is known for the abundance of ancient Neolithic and Thracian sites, with some finds dating as far back as the 5th-6th millennium BC. Evidence from 20th-century excavations reveals that the village burgeoned into an important and wealthy Thracian city in the 5th century BC.

Among its main features are the underground temple, the largest of its kind in the Balkan Peninsula, built under the Chetinyova Mogila (tumulus) and a mausoleum. The temple, as well as the nearby Thracian king's residence under Mount Kozi Gramadi, likely date to the reign of Amadocus II (359-351 BC).

Another important site, the Horizont tumulus, contains the only known Thracian temple to feature a colonnade (a Doric one). It is one of ten tumuli located within the location range.

The Kings' palace and treasury have also been discovered nearby at Kozi Gramadi at 1200m altitude. It was begun under Thracian king Cotys I (384-359 BC). 
The palace is enclosed with a defensive wall preserved up to a height of 2m and two bastions have been revealed. Philip II of Macedon broke in and captured the palace in 341BC from king Teres II (351-341 BC) and evidence of severe destruction has been found. Among the finds many lead slingshot bullets stamped with the names of Philip's generals Cleobulus and Anaxandros were brought to light within the palace.

In 1798, a cell school and a small church dug into the ground were built.  In 1819, the authorities of Constantinople authorized the construction of a new large church, which existed until the April Uprising.  Nearly 2000 Bulgarians and a few dozen Gypsies, mostly blacksmiths and ironworkers, lived in Staro Novo selo just before the uprising.  The village numbered 300 houses and was an important economic center in the area.  There are 17 mills and 5 cinders on the Sand River, as well as 13 mullets and many workshops for carpentry supplies and supplies.  There was also the market for cattle.  Vasil Levski visited the village in 1869 and 1871, establishing a revolutionary committee.

Later, the village took a massive part in the April Uprising.

53 Turks from the village of Irene are beheaded by the rebels.  As a result of the Levski Committees set up in Starosel, rebels from the villages of Tsaratsovo with Ivan Arabadzhiya, Sinjirlii, Gehren, Staro Zhelezare, Krasnovo and Panicheri gather together.

With ox carts, with their children and the household allowance taken, the caravan of the old settlers moves to Dutova Polyana and from there, as a temporary bivouac and meeting point, gathers everyone and heads to Koprivshtitsa.

Starosel makes many casualties - all the houses, the church and the school are burnt down.  All property and food supplies have been plundered.  Part of the population of Eni Kyo is killed, another part migrates to northern Bulgaria.  Most returned to their old settlement, but from superstition did not rebuild the burnt and devastated village, and built a new one  down the river.  They call their new village Eski Eny Kyo (Old New Village - the old village a new village), which name remained until the 1930s, when it was renamed Starosel.

On May 25, 1876, 12 men from Staro Novo Selo (Starosel), participants in the April Uprising, were hanged at the Maritza River Bridge in Plovdiv.  Their names are: Miho Mitkov Kabadjov, Pop Atanas Nenkov, Nayden Ivanov Slaninkov, Pop Marco, Todor Stoyanov Nachev, Tancho Georgiev Proichev, Ivan Gumyushev, Ilin Sarafov, Kuman Doichev Pergov, Kosta Koshelakov -Nyagin, Nikola Tarashev, Pencho Koparanski.  Another 88 men from this heroic village have been sentenced to death.  Due to the intervention of the International Commission, their sentences were replaced by an Anadolu prison.

Two of the rebels - Andrei Mitkov Proichev and Ivan Dobrev Ovnarov - manage to cross the Danube River and from there end up in Russia!  After the declaration of the Russo-Turkish War, these brave men joined the militias.  They participate in the battles of Shipka and Stara Zagora.  For their courage, they were awarded the St. George Cross, a high Russian military distinction.  Andrey Proichev lived long after the Liberation.  For his extraordinary courage during the Russo-Turkish War, he also received a gilded glass - a special gift from Emperor Alexander II.

Notable people 
Born

Andreya Proychev - Bulgarian Volunteer from IV Company, IV Company. He took part in the battles of Shipka and near Stara Zagora.  For his exceptional bravery during the Russo-Turkish War he was awarded the St. George's Cross - a high Russian military award and a gilded cup - personally by Emperor Alexander II.

Stoyanka Gruycheva - competitor in academic rowing

Rangel Gerovski - Bulgarian wrestler in classical style
Ivan Bogdanov Deliverski – National competitor in freestyle wrestling.  European champion.  Multiple champion of Bulgaria.
Ilian Kaziiski bronze medalist at the World Volleyball Championship 1986. Father of Matei Kaziiski.

Died
Georgi Kitov (1943 - 2008), Bulgarian archaeologist

Honour
Starosel Gate on Livingston Island in the South Shetland Islands, Antarctica is named after Starosel.

References

Villages in Plovdiv Province